Soccer America, the oldest soccer-specific media publisher in the US, was founded in 1971 by Clay Berling in Albany, California. The magazine is headquartered in Oakland, California.

History and profile 
The magazine was founded by Clay Berling in 1971 under the name Soccer West. In 1972 the name changed to Soccer America  because the magazine had  begun fulfilling subscriptions nationwide. A weekly print magazine throughout most of its history, Soccer America was included in the Chicago Tribune's selection of "The 50 Best Magazines"  in 2003.

Soccer America launched its Web site in 1995, its e-letters in 2001,and discontinued its print magazine in 2017. Soccer America's e-letters include: SoccerAmericaDaily, SA Confidential, GameReport, Soccer on TV, the YouthSoccerInsider and Paul Gardner's SoccerTalk. Gardner won the National Soccer Hall of Fame Colin Jose Media Award  in 2010. Editor in Chief Paul Kennedy won Colin Jose Media Award in 2017. In 2021, Soccer America celebrated its 50th anniversary. 

Current free-lance contributors include Andrea Canales, Beau Dure, Scott French, Ahmet Guvener, Dr. Dev Mishra, Arlo Moore-Bloom, Ian Plenderleith, Brian Sciaretta, Randy Vogt and Dan Woog.

See also
 Soccer America College Team of the Century
 Soccer America Player of the Year Award

References

External links
 

Association football magazines
Sports magazines published in the United States
Quarterly magazines published in the United States
Association football websites
Magazines established in 1971
Magazines published in California
Soccer mass media in the United States